Ethmiopsis epichthonia is a moth in the family Gelechiidae. It was described by Edward Meyrick in 1935. It is found in Jiangsu, China, and possibly Taiwan.

References

Ethmiopsis
Moths described in 1935
Taxa named by Edward Meyrick